The women's 200 metre freestyle competition at the 2018 Pan Pacific Swimming Championships took place on August 9 at the Tokyo Tatsumi International Swimming Center. The defending champion was Katie Ledecky of the United States.

Records
Prior to this competition, the existing world and Pan Pacific records were as follows:

Results
All times are in minutes and seconds.

Heats
The first round was held on 9 August from 10:00.

Only two swimmers from each country may advance to the A or B final. If a country does not qualify any swimmer to the A final, that same country may qualify up to three swimmers to the B final.

B Final 
The B final was held on 9 August from 17:30.

A Final 
The A final was held on 9 August from 17:30.

References

2018 Pan Pacific Swimming Championships